{{Infobox
| headerstyle = background: gold;
| abovestyle  =
| current = 
| image = 
| above = Snow Volleyball World Tour
| label1 = Full name
| data1 = FIVB Snow Volleyball World Tour
| label2 =Region
| data2 = World
| label3 =Date span
| data3 = April–August
| label4 =Tournaments
| data4 = (Men)(Women) 
| label5 =Type
| data5 = Snow volleyball
| label6 = Events Director
| data6 = 
| header7 = History
| label8 = First tour
| data8 = 2019
| label9 = Number of tours 
| data9 = 3 (2019)
| header10 = Most World Tour titles
| label11 = Men (individual)
| data11 = 
| label12 = Women (individual)
| data12 = 
| header13 = Current World Tour champions
| label14 = Men
| data14 =  
| label15 = Women
| data15 = 
| header16 = Most tournament titles
| label17 = Men (individual)
| data17 = 
| label18 = Women (individual)
| data18 =
}}
The World Tour was introduced in 2019.

Features

Prize money
This table shows total prize money for each tournament of FIVB Snow Volleyball World Tour. All values are in United States dollar.

Tournaments

References

External links
Official site

Volleyball competitions
Sports competition series
Winter sports competitions
Recurring sporting events established in 2019